Sir Thomas Walmsley (died 13 July 1637) was an English politician who sat in the House of Commons between 1621 and 1624.

Walmsley was the son of Thomas Walmesley of Dunkenhalgh and grandson of Sir Thomas Walmsley Justice of Common Pleas. He was knighted on 11 August 1617. In 1621, he was elected Member of Parliament for Clitheroe. He was elected MP for Lancashire in 1624.
 
Walmsley predeceased his father in 1637.

References

Year of birth missing
1637 deaths
English MPs 1621–1622
English MPs 1624–1625
Members of the Parliament of England (pre-1707) for Lancashire